Kenny is an unincorporated community in Mendocino County, California, at the headwaters of Usal Creek.

A post office operated at Kenny from 1888 to 1903 and from 1907 to 1924.

Kenny is a totally unoccupied ghost town accessible only by a remote, mountainous dirt road. As of the 1980s, no buildings or other recognizable landmarks remain.

References

Unincorporated communities in Mendocino County, California
Unincorporated communities in California